The 2007 All-Australian team represents the best performing Australian Football League (AFL) players during the 2007 season. The selection panel provided the 40 leading players of the year in their playing positions at the conclusion of the home and away season before announcing the final 22 at a later date during the All-Australian Presentation Dinner. Of the 40 leading players for that year, the leading 16 midfielders/ruckmen were all respectively nominated, as were the leading twelve defenders and forwards. Six of each were then to be chosen in the final team, with the four interchange positions occupied by players remaining from the group of 40. The team is honorary and does not play any games.

Nine Geelong players made it into the 2007 squad and all were picked for the team.

Selection panel
The selection panel for the 2007 All-Australian team consisted of non-voting chairman Wayne Jackson, Rod Austin, Kevin Bartlett, Andrew Demetriou, Gerard Healy, Neil Kerley, Chris Mainwaring and Robert Walls.

Team

Initial squad

Final team

Note: the position of coach in the All-Australian team is traditionally awarded to the coach of the premiership team.

References

All-Australian Team, 2007
All-Australian team